Eliezer ben Isaac ha-Gadol was a German rabbi of the eleventh century. He was a pupil of his cousin R. Simon ha-Gadol of Mainz and of R. Gershom Me'or ha-Golah. David Conforte, relying on the statement in the tosefta to Shab. 54b, says that Eliezer ha-Gadol was the teacher of Rashi; but Rashi himself, in citing Eliezer, does not say so. In Rashi's quotation he is sometimes called Eliezer ha-Gadol and sometimes Eliezer Gaon, which induced Azulai to consider them as two separate persons. According to Menahem di Lonsano Eliezer ha-Gadol was the author of the well-known Orḥot Ḥayyim or Ẓawwa'at R. Eliezer ha-Gadol, generally attributed to Eliezer b. Hyrcanus. As to the authorship of the seliḥah Elohai Basser 'Ammeka, recited in the service of Yom Kippur Katan and attributed to Eliezer by Michael, see Landshuth,  'Ammude ha-'Abodah, p. 20.

Footnotes

 Its bibliography:
 Chaim Azulai, Shem ha-Gedolim, i. 12a, ii., s.v. ;
 Leopold Zunz, Z. G. pp. 47 et seq.;
 Adolf Jellinek, B. H. iii. 27, 28 of the Preface;
 Samuel Joseph Fuenn, Keneset Yisrael, p. 124;
 Moritz Steinschneider, Cat. Bodl. cols. 957-958;
 Julius Fürst, Bibl. Jud. i. 233.

11th-century German rabbis